Manfred Zielonka (born January 24, 1960, in Krzyżowa Dolina, Poland) is a retired boxer from West Germany. At the 1984 Summer Olympics he won the bronze medal in the men's light middleweight division (– 71 kg). In the semifinals he was beaten by eventual winner Frank Tate of the United States. He also captured bronze two years earlier at the World Championships in Munich, West Germany.

External links
 
 

1960 births
Living people
People from Opole County
Sportspeople from Opole Voivodeship
People from Düren
Sportspeople from Cologne (region)
Polish emigrants to Germany
Welterweight boxers
Light-middleweight boxers
Olympic boxers of West Germany
Boxers at the 1984 Summer Olympics
Olympic bronze medalists for West Germany
Olympic medalists in boxing
Medalists at the 1984 Summer Olympics
German male boxers
AIBA World Boxing Championships medalists